The 1995 Women's World Championship was a women's snooker tournament organised by the World Ladies Billiards and Snooker Association. The quarter-finals onwards were held in New Delhi from 7 to 10 September 1995. The event is recognised as the 1995 edition of the World Women's Snooker Championship first held in 1976. Karen Corr defeated Kim Shaw 6–3 in the final to win the title. The event was promoted by Barry Hearn's Matchroom company.

Qualifying 
The preliminary round and the four main rounds of qualifying took place at Raunds Cue Sports Club. Seven of the top eight seeds qualified for the quarter-finals, the only exception being Sarah Smith, who was beaten by June Banks. The highest  of the qualifying rounds was 86 by Lisa Quick.

Final stages 
The matches from the quarter-finals onwards were due to be played in India in June 1995, but were delayed. The original sponsors were gin producers Highball, but the Indian government imposed a ban on events sponsored by alcohol companies. The rescheduled event planned July was also postponed. The event was then planned to take place from 7 to 10 September with sponsorship from Woodall shoes.

The quarter-finals onwards were played at the Siri Fort Sports Complex, New Delhi. Kim Shaw beat Allison Fisher 5–3 in their semi-final, having led 3–0 before Fisher took the next to make it 3–2. Corr beat Kelly Fisher 5–2 in the other semi-final. In the final, Corr built a 3–0 lead, but Shaw won three of the next four to leave Corr only one frame ahead at 4–3. Corr then took the next two to claim victory at 6–3. As winner, Corr received a motorcycle from event sponsors Honda in addition to £5,000. She also took the highest break prize of £300 for her 108 against Banks. Shaw earned £2,000 as runner-up. It was Corr's second world title, after her first in 1990.

Prize Fund 

Winner: £5,000
Runner-up £2,000
Semi-final: £1,000
Quarter-final: £500
Last 16: £100
Last 32: £75
Last 48: £50
Last 64: £25
Highest break: £300

Main Draw

Final

Early rounds

Preliminary round
 Lisa Ingall 4–2 Hilary Isitt

Rounds 1 to 3

References 

1995 in Indian sport
1995 in snooker
1995 in Indian women's sport
International sports competitions hosted by India
World Women's Snooker Championship